A lucid dream is a dream during which the dreamer is aware that they are dreaming.

Lucid Dream may also refer to:
Lucid Dream (film), a 2017 South Korean film
"Lucid Dreams" (Franz Ferdinand song), 2008
"Lucid Dreams" (Juice Wrld song), 2018
"Lucid Dreaming", a 2016 song by Tinashe from Nightride
"Lucid Dream", a 2018 song by Owl City from Cinematic
"Lucid Dream", a 2021 song by Aespa from Savage
Lucid Dreams 0096, a 1996 album credited to 0096

See also 
 Lucid Air Dream Edition, an electric car